Batroun District is a district (qadaa) in the North Governorate, Lebanon, south of Tripoli. The capital is Batroun. Its borders are created in the south by the river El Jaouz in the north and by the river Madfoun.

Cities and towns
 Aabdelli
 Aabrine
 Aalali
 Aaoura
 Aartiz
 Asia
 Batroun
 Basbina
 Bchaaleh
 Beit Chlala
 Beit Kassab
 Bijdarfil
 Boqsmaiya
 Chatine
 Chekka
 Chibtine
 Daael
 Dahr Abi Yaghi
 Darya
 Deir Billa
 Douma
 Douq
 Eddeh
 Ftahat
 Ghouma
 Hadtoun
 Hamat
 Harbouna
 Hardine
 Heri
 Hilta
 Ijdabra
 Jebla
 Jrabta
 Jran
 Kandoula
 Kfar Abida
 Kfar Chleymane
 Kfar Hatna
 Kfar Hay
 Kfar Hilda
 Kfar Shlaimane
 Kfifane
 Kfour El Arabi
 Koubba
 Kour
 Madfoun
 Mehmarch
 Mar Mama
 Masrah
 Mrah Chdid
 Mrah Ez Ziyat
 Nahla
 Niha, Batroun
 Ouajh El Hajar
 Ouata Houb
 Qandola
 Racha
 Rachana
 Rachkida
 Ram, Batroun
 Ras Nahhach
 Selaata
 Sghar
 Smar Jbeil
 Sourat
 Tannourine El Faouqa
 Thoum
 Toula
 Wata Hob
 Zane

Sources
(Mapquest)

 
Districts of Lebanon
North Governorate